A partial lunar eclipse took place at the Moon's descending node on the evening of 7 August and the morning pre-dawn on 8 August 2017, the second of two lunar eclipses in 2017. The Moon was only slightly covered by the Earth's umbral shadow at maximum eclipse. The Moon's apparent diameter was smaller because the eclipse occurred only 5 days after apogee (Apogee on 2 August 2017).

The moon inside the umbral shadow was a subtle red, but hard to see in contrast to the much brighter moon in the outer penumbral shadow.
The moon looks red because it is illuminated by sunlight refracted through earth's atmosphere. The blue light is scattered and absorbed by the atmosphere, leaving red light to shine onto the lunar surface.

The solar eclipse of 21 August 2017, occurred fourteen days later, in the same eclipse season (Middle of the eclipse season occurred on 16 August 2017). It was the first total solar eclipse visible in the contiguous United States since the solar eclipse of 26 February 1979.

Visibility
It was visible over eastern Europe, Africa, Asia, and Australia with maximal visibility centered on Indian Ocean.

Gallery

Related eclipses

Eclipses of 2017 
 A penumbral lunar eclipse on 11 February.
 An annular solar eclipse on 26 February.
 A partial lunar eclipse on 7 August.
 A total solar eclipse on 21 August.

Lunar year series

Saros series
It is part of Saros series 119 (member 61 of 82).

Half-Saros cycle 
A lunar eclipse will be preceded and followed by solar eclipses by 9 years and 5.5 days (a half saros). This lunar eclipse is related to two total solar eclipses of Solar Saros 126.

See also
 List of 21st-century lunar eclipses
 Lists of lunar eclipses

References

External links

 
 Hermit Eclipse: Partial Lunar Eclipse of 7 Aug, 2017 AD
 Partial Lunar Eclipse 7 Aug, 2017 - Live Webcast
 August's Lunar Eclipse   APOD: Aug 9, 2017

2017-08
2017 in science
August 2017 events